Albert Wolff may refer to:

 Albert Wolff (journalist) (1835–1891), Franco-German journalist
 Albert Wolff (conductor) (1884–1970), French conductor and composer
 Albert Wolff (judge) (1899–1977), Chief Justice of the Supreme Court of Western Australia
 Albert Wolff (fencer) (1906–1989), French-born American Olympic fencer
 Albert Moritz Wolff (1854–1923), German sculptor and medallion-designer
 Albert Wolff (sculptor) (1814–1892), German sculptor